The Journal Record is a daily business and legal newspaper based in Oklahoma City, Oklahoma. Its offices are in downtown Oklahoma City, with a bureau at the Oklahoma State Capitol.

The Journal Record began publication in 1937, though an early predecessor of the newspaper, the Daily Legal News was first published in Oklahoma City on August 27, 1903. The newspaper won The Sequoyah Award for best overall newspaper of its size in 2001, 2006, 2007, 2008, 2009, 2010, 2012, and 2013. In 2014 it won the Sequoyah Award in the state's largest circulation category. The Oklahoma Journalism Hall of Fame includes six Journal Record current or former staff members: Joan Gilmore (1994), Max Nichols (1995), Marie Price (1998), Bill May (2004), David Page (2011), and Mary Mélon (2013). Two non-staff columnists are also Hall of Fame members: Arnold Hamilton (2011) and Joe Hight (2013). Its publisher, Journal Record Publishing Company is an affiliate of BridgeTower Media and also publishes Tinker Take Off and The Journal Record Legislative Report.

History
The Journal Record was the result of a merger of two newspapers, The Daily Law Journal and the Daily Record in 1937. Known then as The Daily Law Journal Record, the paper was published by Freda Ameringer until 1972. Dan Hogan III, who bought the publication from Ameringer, formed the Journal-Record Publishing Company and moved to 621 North Robinson in 1978. Titled The Journal Record from that point on, its location remained the same until the bombing of the Alfred P. Murrah Federal Building.

Dolan Media (now BridgeTower Media) purchased The Journal Record Publishing Company in 1995 and moved its staff in 1996 to the Dowell Center on North Robinson Avenue. In 2006 the offices were moved to Corporate Tower at 101 North Robinson Avenue. The Journal Record expanded its territory to include the Tulsa region in November 2005 and has added an online edition available only through subscription.

The Dolan Company issued an IPO in 2007 and was traded on the New York Stock Exchange under the symbol DM until it was delisted in 2014. The company entered a prepackaged Chapter 11 bankruptcy on Mar. 23, 2014 from which it emerged as a private company owned by Bayside Capital. CEO Jim Dolan was replaced by Mark McEachen, who took on a similar role with Freedom Communications upon its exit from bankruptcy in 2010.

On Dec. 31, 2015, the company was purchased by New Media Investment Group, the parent company of GateHouse Media, for $35 million. Today The Journal Record is owned by BridgeTower Media, the B2B media division of GateHouse Media.

References

External links
The Journal Record
 Encyclopedia of Oklahoma History and Culture - Journal Record

Newspapers published in Oklahoma City
Newspapers established in 1937
Gannett publications